Sun Valley Airport may refer to:

 Sun Valley Airport (Arizona) in Bullhead City, Arizona, United States (FAA: A20)
 Friedman Memorial Airport formerly Sun Valley Airport, in Hailey, Idaho, United States (FAA/IATA: SUN)